SS George Ade was a Liberty ship built in the United States during World War II. She was named after Indiana writer, newspaper columnist, playwright, and namesake for Purdue University's Ross–Ade Stadium, George Ade.

Construction 
George Ade was laid down on 30 June 1944, under a Maritime Commission (MARCOM) contract, MC hull 2314, by J.A. Jones Construction, Panama City, Florida; and launched on 9 August 1944.

History
She was allocated to American West African Line Inc., 18 August 1944. She successfully completed her seatrials on 20 August 1944.

A U.S. Navy seaplane rescued the survivors.

After repairs she was allocated to the Parry Navigation Co., Inc. on 18 July 1946, and again on 17 November 1946. On 17 September 1947, she was allocated to the South Atlantic Steamship Line, for transfer to the National Defense Reserve Fleet, in Mobile, Alabama. She was sold, On 21 February 1967, for $48,259 to Union Minerals and Alloys Corporation, to be scrapped. She was withdrawn from the fleet on 8 March 1967.

Notes

References

Bibliography 

 
 
 
 
 
 

 

Liberty ships
Ships built in Panama City, Florida
1944 ships
Mobile Reserve Fleet